Campbell is a Scottish and Northern Irish surname —derived from the Gaelic roots cam ("crooked") and beul ("mouth")—that had originated as a nickname meaning "crooked mouth" or "wry mouthed." Clan Campbell, historically one of the largest and most powerful of the Highland clans, traces its origins to the ancient Britons of Strathclyde. Between 1200 and 1500 the Campbells emerged as one of the most powerful families in Scotland, dominant in Argyll and capable of wielding a wider influence and authority from Edinburgh to the Hebrides and western Highlands.

Today, the name is found throughout the world as a consequence of large scale emigration from Scotland from the 18th century onwards and the settlement of the Scottish diaspora in many countries particularly the United States, Canada and Australia. Due to significant Scottish immigration in the 16th and 17th Centuries, the name is also found across the island of Ireland but particularly in Ulster. Outside of Ulster, Irish occurrences of the name can also derive from the surname Mac Cathmhaoil, from which also descend the surnames MacCawill, McCaul, MacCall, and Caulfield. The Irish pronunciation of Cathmhaoil ("battle chief") coincided with the Scottish pronunciation of Campbell, and the name was anglicised accordingly.

Campbell is the third most common surname in Northern Ireland, fourth most common in Jamaica, seventh most common in Scotland, 12th most common in Canada, 18th most common in Australia, 41st most common in the United States and 65th most common in England.

Notable persons named Campbell

 Several people named Alexander Campbell
 Several people named Alistair Campbell
 Several people named Andrew Campbell
 Several people named Archibald Campbell
 Several people named Arthur Campbell
 Several people named Bruce Campbell
 Several people named Carol Campbell
 Several people named Catherine Campbell
 Several people named Chris Campbell
 Several people named Charles Campbell
 Several people named Colin Campbell
 Several people named Daniel Campbell
 Several people named Dave Campbell
 Several people named David Campbell
 Several people named Donald Campbell
 Several people named Duncan Campbell

 Several people named Edward Campbell
 Several people named Eric Campbell
 Several people named Geoffrey Campbell
 Several people named George Campbell
 Several people named Glen Campbell
 Several people named Gordon Campbell
 Several people named Graeme Campbell
 Several people named Gregory Campbell
 Several people named Ian Campbell
 Several people named Jack Campbell
 Several people named James Campbell
 Several people named Jeff Campbell
 Several people named Jim Campbell
 Several people named Jimmy Campbell
 Several people named John Campbell
 Several people named Joseph Campbell
 Several people named Julia Campbell
 Several people named Ken Campbell
 Several people named Kevin Campbell

 Several people named Lorne Campbell
 Several people named Luke Campbell
 Several people named Mary Campbell
 Several people named Michael Campbell
 Several people named Neil Campbell
 Several people named Patrick Campbell
 Several people named Peter Campbell
 Several people named Phil Campbell
 Several people named Philip Campbell
 Several people named Robert Campbell
 Several people named Roy Campbell
 Several people named Samuel Campbell
 Several people named Scott Campbell
 Several people named Steven Campbell
 Several people named Thomas Campbell
 Several people named Timothy Campbell
 Several people named William Campbell

Military and politics
 Aileen Campbell, SNP Member of the Scottish Parliament for Clydesdale and Minister for Local Government and Planning
 Alastair Campbell, British political editor and spokesman
 Albert Ralph Campbell, American Medal of Honor recipient
 Colonel Alexander Campbell of Possil, Scottish soldier
 Andrew J. Campbell, American politician
 General Sir Archibald Campbell of Inverneill, Scottish Soldier
 General Sir James Campbell of Inverneill, Scottish Soldier
 Bill Campbell (California politician), American politician
 Bruce Campbell (Alberta politician), Edmonton city alderman 1986–1995
 Colin Campbell, 1st Baron Clyde, British soldier
 Colin Campbell (Scottish politician), SNP Member of the Scottish Parliament for West of Scotland
 Daniel J. Campbell, American Spanish–American War Medal of Honor recipient
 Epsy Campbell Barr, Presidential Candidate in Costa Rica
 Frank Campbell (New York politician), NYS Comptroller 1892–1893
 Francis Eastwood Campbell, Major, 1823–1911, 2nd Clerk of the New Zealand House of Representatives
 Col. Duncan Carter-Campbell of Possil, Scottish soldier
 General George Carter-Campbell, Scottish soldier
 Gordon Campbell (Canadian politician), Premier of British Columbia
 Graeme Campbell (politician), Australian politician
 Sir Guy Campbell, 1st Baronet (1786–1849), British Army officer of the Napoleonic era
 Harvey Campbell (politician), American politician
 Sir Henry Campbell-Bannerman, Prime Minister
 Jack M. Campbell, Governor of New Mexico
 James V. Campbell (1823–1890) was a member of the Michigan Supreme Court from 1858 to 1890.
 James W. Campbell, former member of Maryland House of Delegates
 Jane L. Campbell, first female mayor of Cleveland, Ohio
 John Campbell (of Strachur), well-known Commander-in-Chief
 John B. T. Campbell III, American politician
 Kim Campbell, first female Prime Minister of Canada
 Kim Campbell (pilot), US Air Force A-10 pilot
 Larry Campbell, Canadian politician
 Marsha Campbell, American politician from Missouri
 Marvin Campbell (politician) (1849–1930), American politician from Indiana
 Menzies Campbell, former British Liberal Democrat leader
 Merritt L. Campbell (1864–1915), American politician
 Nan Campbell (1926–2013), American politician
 Samuel Campbell (American politician), Congressional Representative from New York
Sharon Campbell, British diplomat
 Skip Campbell (1948–2018), American politician
 Tunis Campbell  (1812–1891), African-American politician in Reconstruction Georgia
 William Campbell (general), militia leader at the Battle of King's Mountain and at the Battle of Guilford Court House
 William B. Campbell, governor of Tennessee

Sports
Alec Campbell, English footballer
Andrew Campbell (outfielder) (born 1992), Australian professional baseball player
Andy Campbell, English footballer
Bill Campbell (baseball player), American baseball pitcher
Brian Campbell, Canadian former ice hockey player
Calais Campbell, American football player
Cassie Campbell, Canadian former ice hockey player
Chad Campbell,  American golfer
Chance Campbell (born 1999), American football player
Clarence Campbell, Canadian ice hockey executive
Colin Campbell (ice hockey, born 1953), Canadian ice hockey player and executive
Dante Campbell, Canadian soccer player
DJ Campbell, English footballer
Darren Campbell, English sprint athlete and Olympian
Dave Campbell, baseball announcer and former player
Dean Campbell, Scottish footballer
Don Campbell, Canadian retired ice hockey player
Donald Campbell, British car and motorboat racer
Earl Campbell, American football player
Edward Fitzhardinge Campbell, Irish rugby international
Elden Campbell, American basketball player
Eric Campbell, American baseball player
Fraizer Campbell, English footballer (soccer player)
Fred Campbell, English footballer
Gene Campbell, American ice hockey player
Georgia Campbell, All-American Girls Professional Baseball League player
Greg Campbell (cricketer), Australian cricketer
Harvey Campbell (football player), Canadian football player
Hugh Campbell (baseball), Irish baseball player
J. Campbell, English footballer
Jason Campbell, American football player
Jean Campbell, All-American Girls Professional Baseball League player
Jeannette Campbell, Argentine swimmer
Jerry Campbell, American-Canadian football player
Jim Campbell (baseball executive), American baseball executive
Joel Campbell, Costa Rican footballer
Julia Campbell (footballer), New Zealand women's international football player
Keith Campbell (cricketer), New Zealand cricketer
Kevin Campbell (footballer), English footballer
Kieran Campbell, Irish scumhalf
LeRoy Campbell, American football player
Louis Campbell, American basketball player
Malcolm Campbell, British holder of world land and water speed records
Michael Campbell, New Zealand golfer
Michael Campbell, Jamaican track and field sprinter
Mike Campbell (first baseman), Irish-American baseball player
Mike Campbell (pitcher), American baseball pitcher
Natalie Campbell (after marriage Thurlow), New Zealand curler
Nate Campbell, current WBA, IBF and WBO lightweight boxing champion
Parris Campbell, American football player
Preston Campbell, Australian rugby league player
Randy Campbell,(Quarterback) Auburn University
Ryan Campbell, Australian cricketer
Selvin Campbell, birth name of boxer Lefty Satan Flynn
Sherwin Campbell, Barbadian cricketer
Shannon Campbell, Australian rules footballer
Sol Campbell, English footballer (soccer player)
Tara Campbell, Canadian water polo player
Terran Campbell, Canadian soccer player
Terry Campbell, Canadian-born German ice hockey player
Tevaughn Campbell, American football player
Tilden Campbell, American college sports coach
Tyger Campbell (born 2000), American basketball player
Tyson Campbell (born 2000), American football player
Veronica Campbell-Brown, Jamaican sprinter
William C. Campbell, American amateur golfer and former USGA president

Television, film, and stage
Bruce Campbell, American actor
Carol Campbell (actress), German actress
Christian Campbell, Canadian actor and brother of Neve Campbell
Conchita Campbell, Canadian actress
Danielle Campbell, American actress
Evelyn Campbell (actress) (1868 – ?), British-born American stage actress
Graeme Campbell, Canadian film director
J. Kenneth Campbell, American actor
John Campbell (broadcaster), New Zealand current events television presenter on "Campbell Live"
Julia Campbell, American actress
Ken Hudson Campbell, American actor
Martin Campbell, New Zealand director
Maurice S. Campbell, American silent film director
Naomi Campbell (born 1970), British supermodel, actress and singer
Neve Campbell, Canadian actress
Nicky Campbell, Scottish TV journalist and presenter
Norman Campbell, Canadian composer, director and Officer of the Order of Canada
Patrick Campbell, 3rd Baron Glenavy, Irish-born British journalist, humorist and television personality
Tisha Campbell-Martin, American actress
Tim Campbell (actor), ex-Home and Away star and host of Million Dollar Wheel of Fortune
Vernon Campbell, American actor
William Campbell (film actor), American actor

Music, art, and literature
Alex Campbell (1931–1987), Scottish folk singer
Ali Campbell, singer-songwriter of the English reggae band UB40
Ashley Campbell (born 1986), American musician; daughter of Glen Campbell
Beck (born Bek Campbell), American musician
Brun Campbell (1884–1952), American ragtime composer and pianist
Cecil Bustamente Campbell, better known as Prince Buster (1938–2016), musician from Kingston, Jamaica
Chris Campbell, American artist 
Christine Campbell (born 1938), British Soprano
Darius Campbell (1980–2022), Scottish singer, songwriter
Eddie Campbell, Scottish graphic novelist, artist
Eddie C. Campbell (1939–2018), American musician and singer
Felicity Campbell (artist), English artist
Glen Campbell (1936–2017), American country artist and actor
Glenn Ross Campbell, rock guitarist
Grace Campbell (1895–1963), Canadian writer
Hazel Campbell (1940–2018), Jamaican writer
Helen Stuart Campbell (1839–1918; pseudonym, "Helen Wheaton"), American author, editor, social reformer, home economist
Isobel Campbell, Scottish musician
J. Scott Campbell, comic book artist
Jimmy Campbell (1944–2007), singer-songwriter from Liverpool
John Francis Campbell, (1822–1885) Celtic scholar
John W. Campbell (1910–1971), American editor of science fiction magazine Astounding Stories
Joe Campbell, singer-songwriter and producer of The Time Frequency
Julia Campbell (1967–2007), American journalist
Ken Campbell (1941–2008), British writer, actor, director and comedian
Kurtis Campbell, British DJ
Liza Campbell (born 1959), Scottish artist, calligrapher, columnist and writer
Lorne Campbell Scottish art historian
Nellie Campobello (originally spelled Campbell), (1900–1986), Mexican writer
Nina Campbell, English interior designer
Phil Campbell, guitarist of the heavy metal band Motörhead
Ramsey Campbell, British horror writer
Reginald Campbell (1894–1950), British writer
Rosemary Campbell (born 1944), New Zealand painter
Roy Campbell Jr. (1952–2014), American jazz musician
Roy Campbell (1901–1957), South African poet and critic
Sidney S. Campbell (1909–1974), English organist
Sophie Campbell, American comic book creator
Steve Campbell (1953–2007), British artist
Tevin Campbell, American music artist
Tina Campbell (born 1974), American musician and singer
Thomas Campbell (1777–1844), Scottish poet
V. Floyd Campbell (1873–1906), American illustrator
Vivian Campbell, Northern Irish rock guitarist

Science and education
 Alfred Walter Campbell (1868–1937), English neuroanatomic scientist
 Archibald George Campbell (1880–1954), Australian ornithologist
 Archibald James Campbell (1853–1929), Australian ornithologist
 Betty Campbell (1934–2017), Welsh head teacher
 Charlotte C. Campbell (1914–1993), American medical mycologist
 Colen Campbell, Scottish neo-Palladian architect
 Colin Campbell (geologist), oil industry analyst
 Colin Campbell (academic), Vice-Chancellor of the University of Nottingham
 Donald T. Campbell, American professor of psychology and education
 Eila Campbell (1915–1994), English geographer
 George Ashley Campbell, American pioneer in the theory of electronic filters
 George Campbell Jr., President of The Cooper Union for the Advancement of Science and Art
 Ian McDonald Campbell, engineer
 Jacquelyn Campbell (born 1946), American nurse
 Jane Maud Campbell (1869 – 1947), American librarian and social reformer
 Jean Helen St. Clair Campbell
 Jonathan A. Campbell, American herpetologist
 John Edward Campbell, mathematician known for the Baker-Campbell-Hausdorff
 John Francis Campbell, Celtic scholar
 John Maurice Hardman Campbell (1891–1973), British physician and medical journal editor
 Joseph Campbell, mythologist
 Lyle Campbell, linguist
 Mary Schmidt Campbell, Dean of Tisch School of the Arts, New York University
 Murray Campbell, computer scientist
 Neil Campbell (scientist), American scientist and textbook author
 Norman Robert Campbell, English physicist and measuremental theorist
 Reginald Campbell Thompson, British archaeologist
 Samuel Campbell (doctor), ship's surgeon on board HMS Plumper 1857–1861 and the namesake of the city Campbell River, British Columbia and of Campbell Island
 Sabine Hyland (née Campbell), American anthropologist
 T. Colin Campbell (1934), American biochemist

Other
 Alan Campbell, Baron Campbell of Alloway (1917–2013), British judge, barrister and writer
 Alexander Campbell, American religious figure and a leader of the Restoration Movement
 Ann-Marie Campbell, Jamaican-American business executive
 Charles Rodman Campbell Convicted murderer hanged in Washington state in 1994
 Christiana Burdett Campbell, (c. 1723 – 1792) Colonial American innkeeper
 Ernest T. Campbell, American Presbyterian clergyman
 Ffyona Campbell, British woman who was the first woman to walk around the world
 Maria Campbell, Native American author of Canadian descent
 Minnie Campbell (1862–1952), Canadian clubwoman, lecturer, and editor
 Patrick Campbell (INLA member)
 Pete Campbell, fictional character
 Reginald John Campbell, British cleric and theologian
 Ralph E. Campbell (1867–1921), American attorney born in Pennsylvania, earned an LLB. from University of Kansas Law School and who became notable in Indian Territory and its successor, the state of Oklahoma, appointed as federal judge (1907–1918)
 Simone Campbell (born 1945), feminist nun
 Thomas Lopton Campbell Jr., 19th-century American pioneer and Texas Ranger
 Todd J. Campbell (1956–2021), American judge
 Will D. Campbell (1924–2013), American Baptist minister, activist, writer, and lecturer
 William Durant Campbell, awardee of the Bronze Wolf in 1939
 Matthew Charles Campbell (born 1973), American attorney born in Worcester, Massachusetts

See also
Clan Campbell, a Scottish clan
Clan Campbell of Cawdor, a Scottish clan
Duke of Argyll

References

English-language surnames
Scottish surnames
Anglicised Scottish Gaelic-language surnames